Rafael Marques Pinto (born September 21, 1983 in Rio de Janeiro), most commonly known as Rafael Marques, is a Brazilian footballer who currently plays for Vasco.

Honours
Botafogo
Copa Rio: 2007

Grêmio
Campeonato Gaúcho: 2010

Atlético Mineiro
Campeonato Mineiro: 2012, 2013
Copa Libertadores: 2013

References

External links
 
 canalbotafogo.com
 terra.com

1983 births
Living people
Association football defenders
Brazilian footballers
Brazilian expatriate footballers
Brasiliense Futebol Clube players
Botafogo de Futebol e Regatas players
Goiás Esporte Clube players
Grêmio Foot-Ball Porto Alegrense players
Clube Atlético Mineiro players
Hellas Verona F.C. players
Copa Libertadores-winning players
Coritiba Foot Ball Club players
Campeonato Brasileiro Série A players
Serie A players
Expatriate footballers in Italy
Footballers from Rio de Janeiro (city)